Gyrineum is a genus of predatory sea snails, marine gastropod mollusks in the family Cymatiidae.

Species
Species within the genus Gyrineum include:

 Gyrineum aculeatum (Schepman, 1909)
 Gyrineum bituberculare (Lamarck, 1816)
 Gyrineum bozzettii (Beu, 1998)
 Gyrineum concinnum (Dunker, 1862)
 Gyrineum cuspidatum (Reeve, 1844)
 Gyrineum gyrinum (Linnaeus, 1758)
 Gyrineum hirasei (Kuroda & Habe in Habe, 1961)
 Gyrineum lacunatum (Mighels, 1845)
 Gyrineum longicaudatum Beu, 1998
 Gyrineum natator (Röding, 1798)
 Gyrineum perca (Perry, 1811)
 Gyrineum pulchellum (G.B. Sowerby I, 1825)
 Gyrineum pusillum (Broderip, 1833)
 Gyrineum roseum (Reeve, 1844)
 Gyrineum wilmerianum Preston, 1908
 Species brought into synonymy
 Gyrineum atlanticum Fechter, 1975: synonym of Halgyrineum louisae (Lewis, 1974)
 Gyrineum bufonium Link, 1807: synonym of  Bursa bufonia (Gmelin, 1791)
 Gyrineum cuspidataeformis Kira, 1956: synonym of Gyrineum lacunatum (Mighels, 1845)
 Gyrineum echinatum Link, 1807: synonym of  Bufonaria echinata (Link, 1807)
 † Gyrineum elsmerense English, 1914: synonym of † Reticutriton elsmerensis (English, 1914) (original combination)
 Gyrineum louisae Lewis, 1974: synonym of Halgyrineum louisae (Lewis, 1974)
 Gyrineum nanshaensis Zhang, 2004: synonym of Gyrineum lacunatum (Mighels, 1845)
 Gyrineum pacator Iredale, 1931: synonym of Bufonaria margaritula (Deshayes, 1832)
 Gyrineum pusilla (Brodrip, 1833): synonym of Gyrineum pusillum (Broderip, 1833)
 Gyrineum pusillum auct.: synonym of Gyrineum lacunatum (Mighels, 1845)
 Gyrineum pusillus [sic]: synonym of Gyrineum pusillum (Broderip, 1833) (misspelling)
 Gyrineum verrucosum Link, 1807: synonym of Gyrineum gyrinum (Linnaeus, 1758)
 Gyrineum wilmeriana Preston, 1908: synonym of Gyrineum wilmerianum Preston, 1908 (wrong gender agreement of specific epithet)

References

 Beu A. (2010). Catalogue of Tonnoidea

External links
 Link D.H.F. (1807-1808). Beschreibung der Naturalien-Sammlung der Universität zu Rostock. Rostock: Adlers Erben.
 Montfort P. [Denys de. (1808-1810). Conchyliologie systématique et classification méthodique des coquilles. Paris: Schoell. Vol. 1: pp. lxxxvii + 409 [1808]. Vol. 2: pp. 676 + 16]
  Beu A.G. (1998). Résultats des Campagnes MUSORSTOM: 19. Indo-West Pacific Ranellidae, Bursidae and Personidae (Mollusca: Gastropoda), a monograph of the New Caledonian fauna and revisions of related taxa. Mémoires du Muséum National d'Histoire Naturelle. 178: 1-255

Cymatiidae